Anadolu Efes Biracılık ve Malt Sanayii A.Ş.(lit. Anadolu Efes Brewery and Malt Industries) produces and markets beer and malt and non-alcoholic beverages in a wide geographical area comprising Turkey, Russia, the Commonwealth of Independent States (CIS), Europe, Central Asia and the Middle East. Anadolu Efes is a member of the Anadolu Group. Anadolu Group was founded in 1950 by the Özilhan and Yazıcı families. Exhibiting a rapid and sustainable growth since its inception,  the Anadolu Group transformed into a holding company in 1969.

Commencing its operations in Turkey in 1969, Anadolu Efes has been the market leader since the 1980s. From the 1990s onwards the company expanded its operations overseas; this in itself can be considered as a turning point. Continuing its operations in order to ensure commercial sustainability in the global market, Anadolu Efes increased its strength in the foreign markets by entering into a strategic partnership with SABMiller. With the agreement signed in 2012, Anadolu Efes took over SABMiller's operations in Russia and Ukraine and became the second largest beer manufacturer in Russia.

Anadolu Efes currently continues its operations as a global company, which exports three quarters of its production. In terms of sales volume, it is the 6th largest brewer in Europe, and the 11th largest in the world. Exporting products to over 70 countries, Anadolu Efes is one of the key players in the region with a total of 15 breweries, six malt production facilities and one hops processing facility across Turkey, Kazakhstan, Russia, Moldova, Georgia and Ukraine.

Product line

In addition to its flagship Pilsener, Efes also produces several other beers, including Efes Draft, semi-pasteurised for a fresh, just brewed flavour with a 6 month shelf life, Efes Dark, double-roasted malt lager with 6.5% alcohol and hints of caramel, Efes Light, a 3.0% ABV take on the original, Efes Xtra, a hoppier, 7.5% ABV lager, Efes Ice, a softer, more aromatic, ice-brewed version with 4.2% alcohol, and Efes Dark Brown, a 6.1% ABV double-roasted malt lager with a distinct coffee and chocolate bouquet.

Other brands under the Efes Beverage Group are Gusta (5.0% ABV), the company's wheat beer brand; Mariachi, under which the lime or agave-flavored beers Mariachi (4.2% ABV) and Mariachi Black (6.0% ABV) are produced; Marmara, under which the strong-beers Marmara Kırmızı (6.1% ABV) and Marmara Gold (4.1% ABV) are produced; and Ritmix, the company's range of fruit-flavored, non-alcoholic malt drinks.

Various international brands have been brewed, marketed and distributed in Turkey through Efes Beer Group in recent years, including Miller Genuine Draft as of 2000, Beck's as of May 2002, and Foster's Lager as of March 2005.

In addition to the Efes product range, the company offers a wide variety of local brands with different tastes and appeal. These include Stary Melnik, Bely Medved, Gold Mine Beer, Sokol, Krasny Vostok, Vostochnaya Bavaria, Zhigulevskoe, Polniy Nokaut, Green Beer, Dolce Iris, Sib-Beer, Yantarnoe, Solodov, Ershistoe, Barkhatnoe, Bogemskoe svetloe, Ak Bars, in Russia; Karagandinskoe in Kazakhstan; Chisinau, Vitanta Premium Classic in Moldova; Weifert, Weifert Belo, Pils Plus, Zajecarsko Pivo and Standard in Serbia & Montenegro. Such local brands continue to contribute to the company's international revenue stream.

Efes Beverage group further produces German Warsteiner, Dutch Bavaria Premium and Amsterdam Navigator, Czech Zlatopramen and Mexican Sol under licence in Russia.

Market reach

Aside from its domestic market in Turkey, where it has 84% market share, Efes exports to over 50 markets in Africa, Asia, Europe, North America, and Oceania. In the UK, it is sold by the Wetherspoons pub chain.

Efes is also the largest local shareholder of the Coca-Cola franchise in Turkey and produces a range of soft drinks.

Efes brand, the flagship of Efes Beer Group (EBG), revised its logo, label, and bottle design in April 2009.

See also 

 List of food companies

References

External links

 Anadolu Efes 

Beer in Turkey
Conglomerate companies of Turkey
Manufacturing companies based in Istanbul
Food and drink companies based in Istanbul
Food and drink companies established in 1969
Turkish brands
Turkish companies established in 1969